Bill Wise is an American voice and film actor, best known for his roles in anime dubs as well as in films by Richard Linklater and Trey Edward Shults.

As a writer, in 2013 Wise won Best Writing award at New York Television Festival for his work in the film Disenchanted.

Filmography

Film

Television

Video games

References

External links

Living people
American male video game actors
American male voice actors
Place of birth missing (living people)
Year of birth missing (living people)